Stenoptilia elkefi is a moth of the family Pterophoridae. It is known from Tunisia, Cyprus, southern Europe, Jordan, Turkey, Turkmenistan and Yemen.

The wingspan is 17–19 mm.

References

elkefi
Moths described in 1984
Moths of the Arabian Peninsula
Plume moths of Africa
Plume moths of Asia
Plume moths of Europe
Taxa named by Ernst Arenberger